Cyrtacanthacris is the type genus of grasshoppers in the subfamily Cyrtacanthacridinae. Species records are distributed in Africa through to Indo-China.

Species 
The Orthoptera Species File lists:
Cyrtacanthacris aeruginosa Stoll, 1813
Cyrtacanthacris celebensis Finot, 1907
Cyrtacanthacris consanguinea Serville, 1838
Cyrtacanthacris consobrina Walker, 1870
Cyrtacanthacris neocaledonica Finot, 1907
Cyrtacanthacris sulphurea Johnston, 1935
Cyrtacanthacris tatarica Linnaeus, 1758 - type species (as Gryllus tataricus L. = C. tatarica tatarica)

Gallery

References

External links
 
 

Acrididae genera